John Bryans (died March 2, 1989)  was a British actor, who appeared frequently on television.

He is possibly best known for his recurring role as Bercol during the first two series of Blake's 7. He also appeared in the third series as the torturer Shrinker. He also appeared in the Doctor Who serial The Creature from the Pit.

Other television credits include: Justice, Bel Ami, Danger Man, The Baron, Dixon of Dock Green, Z-Cars, The Champions, Softly, Softly, The First Lady, Randall and Hopkirk (Deceased), The Guardians, The Troubleshooters, Colditz, Rock Follies, The Gentle Touch,  Wilde Alliance and Only Fools and Horses. His film roles included the estate agent in the horror anthology The House That Dripped Blood (1970), and Cardinal Wolsey in Henry VIII and His Six Wives (1972).

Filmography
 The Verdict (1964) - Prendergast
Downfall (1964) - Arlett
The House That Dripped Blood (1971) - A.J. Stoker
Henry VIII and His Six Wives (1972) - Wolsey

References

External links
 
 John Bryans at Theatricalia (earliest credit is 7 April 1952 - very unlikely he began his career as a nine-year-old unless very talented)

1942 births
1989 deaths
British male television actors
20th-century British male actors
British male film actors